Beaune is the wine capital of Burgundy in the Côte d'Or department in eastern France. It is located between Lyon and Dijon. Beaune is one of the key wine centers in France, and the center of Burgundy wine production and business. The annual wine auction of the Hospices de Beaune is the primary wine auction in France.

The town is surrounded by some of the world's most famous wine villages, while the facilities and cellars of many producers, large and small, are situated in the historic center of Beaune itself, as they have been since Roman times. With a rich historical and architectural heritage, Beaune is considered the "Capital of Burgundy wines". It is an ancient and historic town on a plain by the hills of the Côte d'Or, with features remaining from the pre-Roman and Roman eras, through the medieval and renaissance periods.

Beaune is a walled city, with about half of the battlements, ramparts, and the moat, having survived in good condition. The central "old town" or "vieille ville" is extensive. Historically Beaune is intimately connected with the Dukes of Burgundy.

The 15th-century Hospices de Beaune, in the town center, is one of the best preserved renaissance buildings in Europe. Other landmarks in Beaune include the old market (les Halles), the Beffroi (clock tower), and the collegiate church of Notre Dame. Beaune is the main center for the "Burgundian tile" polychrome renaissance roofing style of the region. Because of its historical importance in wine production and the unique system of terroir in the region, the town of Beune was inscribed on the UNESCO World Heritage List in 2015 as part of the Climats, terroirs of Burgundy site.

Wine

Beaune is one of the wine communes of the Côte de Beaune subregion of the Burgundy wine region, which bears the name of this town. Although Beaune is lacking a Grand Cru vineyard in the commune, it is the hub of the region's wine business, as most of Burgundy's major négociants are here. Beaune is renowned for its annual charity wine auction on behalf of the Hospices de Beaune.

It is on the route des Grands Crus tourist trail among the vineyards. The road runs north from Beaune to Gevrey Chambertin and Nuits-Saint-Georges and south to Nolay, Saisy and Autun.

The Town

Beaune is the centre for wine industry services (such as tractors and equipment for vat-rooms) as well as a number of wine-related institutes and education facilities. The train station is served by TGV, through Dijon or Lyon.

There is a comprehensive "traditional" shopping area clustered around the central square with a focus on gourmet food, fashion, and wine, while large supermarkets, business parks, etc., are situated on the outskirts of town.

Beaune has a major fine food market on Saturdays, where there are a large number of stall holders supplying a broad selection of products and specialties from Burgundy and the surrounding regions. For example, Bresse chickens, Jura cheeses, small goods, spices, produce of every variety as well as seasonal specialties such as truffles. There is a smaller market on Wednesday, and special-event markets and fetes are held throughout the year.

Although Beaune is not primarily a tourist town but one centred on the wine industry, it nevertheless attracts a large amount of tourists. About five traditional smaller hotels are located within the city walls with around five chain hotels on the outskirts.

Beaune is one of a number of towns in Europe asserting a key role in the "invention of film"; a number of murals and other tourist attractions reflect this.

Technically Beaune is a commune in eastern France, a sub-prefecture of department 21, the Côte-d'Or department, in the Bourgogne-Franche-Comté region.

Population

Origin, Geography and Climate
The name "Beaune" derives from the Latinised Gaulish word "Belena", which was the name of a spring around which the settlement was established.  That name in turn is derived from "Belen" or "Belenos", a god of fast-flowing water.  A Roman fort was built there in the first century A.D. and it was already a prosperous wine-growing region in the 13th century.

The town is served by a small watercourse, the "Bouzaise" (or "Bouzaize") of which the source is in a public park at the north-east boundary.

Beaune has a semi-continental climate with an oceanic tendency. The oceanic influence is seen with frequent rains in each season (though Autumn has the most and Summer has the least) and many weather changes. On the other hand, one sees the semi-continental influence with one of the greatest seasonal temperature differences, characterized by cold winters with frequent snowfall, and hot summers with violent storms. It is this climate which creates the unique environment for which the Côte d'Or is so readily known.

Hospices de Beaune
Founded in 1442 by Nicolas Rolin, chancellor of the Duke of Burgundy, and his wife, the Hospices are a charity running hospitals and other services for the needy. Following from past donations, they own vineyards in Burgundy.

The American Expeditionary Forces University at Beaune
At the end of WWI the American Expeditionary Forces University was established in Beaune, complete with its own chapter of Phi Beta Kappa. Faculty included Walter M. Chandler, a Progressive Party member and, later, a Republican Party member of the U.S. House of Representatives from the State of New York.

Notable people 
 Nicolas Grozelier (1692-1778), 18th-century French fabulist
 Louis Chevrolet (1878–1941), race car driver, co-founder of the Chevrolet Motor Car Company, co-founder of the Frontenac Motor Corporation with brothers Gaston and Arthur.
 Arthur Chevrolet (1884–1946), race car driver and co-founder of the Frontenac Motor Corporation with brothers Louis and Gaston.
 Gaston Chevrolet (1892–1920), 1920 Indianapolis 500 winner and 1920 AAA National Champion race car driver,  co-founder of the Frontenac Motor Corporation with brothers Louis and Arthur.
 Bruno Latour (1947-2022), anthropologist and an influential theorist in the field of science and technology studies.
 Étienne-Jules Marey (1830–1904), scientist and chronophotographer, widely considered to be a pioneer of photography and an influential pioneer of the history of cinema.
 Gaspard Monge (1746–1818), mathematician and inventor of descriptive geometry.
 Félix Ziem (1821–1911), painter in the style of the Barbizon School.

International relations

Beaune is twinned with:

 Nantucket, Massachusetts, United States, since 2006
 Bensheim, Hessen,  Germany, since 1960
 Malmedy, Liège Province, Belgium, since 1962
 Krems an der Donau, Lower Austria, Austria, since 1976
 Kōshū, Yamanashi,  Japan, since 1976

Gallery

See also
Communes of the Côte-d'Or department
French wine
List of works by Henri Chapu Sculptor of Beaune memorial 1870

References

External links

 Official website
 Beaune Tourism office

 
Communes of Côte-d'Or
Subprefectures in France
Côte-d'Or communes articles needing translation from French Wikipedia
Burgundy